Mary Duncan was an actress.

Mary Duncan may also refer to:

Mary Duncan (writer)
Mary Lundie Duncan, poet
Mary Duncan, co-founder of W & M Duncan and Company
Mary Duncan Library, Benson, North Carolina
Mary Duncan, fictional character in The House by the Churchyard